Ansel Earle Wallace (October 30, 1884 - December 20, 1941) was a photojournalist and newsreel cameraman who gained prominence in 1915 when he covered World War I.

Early life and career

Ansel Earle Wallace was born on October 30, 1884 in South Bend, Indiana. His father and his brother Harry were all photographers. In 1910, Wallace went to New York City where he started working as a press photographer for the newspapers of William Randolph Hearst. He shot his first film in 1914 while covering the Mexican War together with his colleague Ariel Varges. 

Sent to Europe in November 1914 by Hearst, Wallace filmed the German offensive on the Eastern Front, was captured by a German submarine when he tried to cross the English Channel and finally made his way to Italy to report on the Italian entry into the war.

One of the first newsreel cameramen in American film history, Wallace had a major scoop in 1915 with his pictures of the new super submarines that were deployed by the German Navy.

Wallace returned to America in July 1915. By 1918 he had left the Hearst news service and for the rest of his life Wallace worked for Wallace and Sons Photography. He died in Evansville, Indiana, on December 20, 1941 and was buried in Oakville Cemetery.

Film work

Wallace’s films taken during World War I were shown in the Hearst-Selig News Pictorial. Some of these newsreels have been located in the collection of the Library of Congress and the Austrian Film Archives by film historians Cooper C. Graham and Ron van Dopperen while researching their book American Cinematographers in the Great War, 1914-1918, notably scenes taken on the Eastern Front, at a POW camp near Frankfurt, Germany, and a rare scene showing Field Marshall von Hindenburg and his staff.  

Numerous still pictures taken by Wallace at the front have also been identified by the authors.

Sources 

 Kevin Brownlow, The War, the West and the Wilderness (London/New York 1979)

 James W. Castellan, Ron van Dopperen, Cooper C. Graham, American Cinematographers in the Great War, 1914-1918 (New Barnet, 2014) https://doi.org/10.2307%2Fj.ctt1bmzn8c

 Field Marshall Von Hindenburg and his military staff, filmed by Ansel E. Wallace (newsreel footage, shot January 1915)

 Movie Trailer "American Cinematographers in the Great War, 1914-1918"

References

1884 births
1941 deaths
20th-century American photographers
war photography
 American war photographers
American photojournalists
Hearst Communications people
World War I photographers
war correspondents of World War I
People from South Bend, Indiana
People from Evansville, Indiana
Journalists from Indiana